Pueblo of Sandia Village is a census-designated place (CDP) in Sandoval County, New Mexico, United States. The population was 344 at the 2000 census. It is part of the Albuquerque Metropolitan Statistical Area.

Geography

According to the United States Census Bureau, the CDP has a total area of 1.0 square mile (2.5 km2), all land.

Demographics

As of the census of 2000, there were 344 people, 113 households, and 89 families residing in the CDP. The population density was 356.7 people per square mile (138.4/km2). There were 125 housing units at an average density of 129.6 per square mile (50.3/km2). The racial makeup of the CDP was 4.07% White, 0.29% African American, 94.48% Native American, and 1.16% from two or more races. Hispanic or Latino of any race were 4.07% of the population.

There were 113 households, out of which 44.2% had children under the age of 18 living with them, 31.0% were married couples living together, 29.2% had a female householder with no husband present, and 21.2% were non-families. 16.8% of all households were made up of individuals, and 5.3% had someone living alone who was 65 years of age or older. The average household size was 3.04 and the average family size was 3.35.

In the CDP, the population was spread out, with 33.4% under the age of 18, 10.2% from 18 to 24, 27.6% from 25 to 44, 20.9% from 45 to 64, and 7.8% who were 65 years of age or older. The median age was 29 years. For every 100 females, there were 90.1 males. For every 100 females age 18 and over, there were 90.8 males.

The median income for a household in the CDP was $31,000, and the median income for a family was $35,179. Males had a median income of $25,179 versus $23,906 for females. The per capita income for the CDP was $11,240. About 16.5% of families and 19.8% of the population were below the poverty line, including 24.0% of those under age 18 and 22.7% of those age 65 or over.

Education
It is in the Bernalillo Public Schools district, which operates Bernalillo Middle School (the zoned middle school of this community), and Bernalillo High School.

See also

 List of census-designated places in New Mexico

References

External links

Census-designated places in Sandoval County, New Mexico
Census-designated places in New Mexico
Albuquerque metropolitan area